Sámsonháza is a village in Nógrád County,  Northern Hungary Region, Hungary.

References

Populated places in Nógrád County